The bizcochito or biscochito (diminutive of the Spanish bizcocho) is a New Mexican cuisine crisp butter cookie, flavored with sugar, cinnamon, and anise. The dough is rolled thin and cut into the shape of the fleur-de-lis, the Christian cross, a star, or a circle, symbolizing the moon.

The cookie was developed in New Mexico over the centuries from the first Spanish colonists of what was then known as Santa Fe de Nuevo México. The roots of this pastry date back as far as the Battle of Puebla in 1862, where French Emperor Maximilian was overthrown by the Mexicans. This date is now famously recognized in the United States as Cinco de Mayo, literally the "Fifth of May".

Biscochitos are commonly served during celebrations such as wedding receptions, baptisms, and religious (especially Catholic) holidays, and frequently during the Christmas season. They are also usually served with coffee.

State cookie
In 1989, the U.S. State of New Mexico made the bizcochito its official state cookie, making New Mexico the first U.S. state to have an official state cookie. It was chosen to help maintain traditional home-baked cookery. To date, New Mexico remains one of only two states with a state cookie, alongside Massachusetts' chocolate-chip cookie. Lupe Jackson, a New Mexican native, won first prize in a New England cookie contest in 2008 for her Bizcochito recipe—overcoming the Huckabees' snickerdoodles and the Romneys' Welsh skillet cakes.

Cooking Tips 
Here are 8 tips by Lupe Jackson about improving the quality of bizcochitos:

 Use lard as shortening.
 Mix the dough with hands for a couple minutes past the point when the ingredients seem to have mixed together.
 Refrigerate the dough for several days before baking.
 Limit the handling of dough to keep it from toughening.
 Pat dough down with hand and finish with a rolling pin.
 Make cookies thick to add flavor. 3/8" dough will bake 1/2" cookie.
 Line cookie sheet with parchment. Bake at 350 degrees for 15–20 minutes. 
 If cinnamon and sugar topping is desired, sprinkle it on while the cookie is still warm.

See also
 New Mexican cuisine
 List of cookies
 List of U.S. state foods

References 

New Mexican cuisine
Cookies
Cuisine of the Southwestern United States
Anise
Christmas food
Butter